Central School was a historic school building located at Ticonderoga in Essex County, New York.  It was built in 1906 and was a -story, eleven-bay-wide by seven-bay-deep brick building with Jacobean Revival style features.  The features included parapeted gables, round arched entrances, and a steeply pitched multi-gabled roof.  A rear -story addition had a slate hipped roof.  It was built on the site of the Academy, Ticonderoga's first high school.  It was used as a school until 1967; from 1967 to 1984 it was used as a civic center for community activities.

It was listed on the National Register of Historic Places in 1988, and was demolished in 2001.

References

School buildings on the National Register of Historic Places in New York (state)
School buildings completed in 1906
Buildings and structures in Essex County, New York
National Register of Historic Places in Essex County, New York
Buildings and structures demolished in 2001
Demolished buildings and structures in New York (state)
1906 establishments in New York (state)